Dr. Carlos d'Assumpção Park is a water-side park in Sé, Macau, China. It is located on Avenida Dr. Carlos d'Assumpção.

The park features:

 Kun Lam statue
 arbor
 playground
 fountains
 ponds
 promenade along the Outer Harbour

See also

 List of tourist attractions in Macau

Sé, Macau
Urban public parks in Macau